Mathare Valley is a part of Mathare slum in Kenya. It is in the Nairobi area.
Other informal settlements in the Nairobi area include Huruma, Kiambiu, Korogocho, Mukuru and Kibera. It has a high population density. 
 It is a few kilometers from the centre of Nairobi. The Mathare River flows in the valley.

Details 

The Mathare Valley is one of the oldest and used to be one of the worst slum areas in Nairobi.  People live in 6 ft. x 8 ft. shanties made of old tin and mud.  There are no beds, no electricity, and no running water.  People sleep on pieces of cardboard on the dirt floors of the shanties.  There are public toilets shared by up to 100 people and residents have to pay to use them.  Those who cannot afford to pay must use the alleys and ditches between the shanties.  "Flying toilets" are plastic bags used by the residents at night, then thrown into the Nairobi River, which is the source of the residents' water supply.

Approximately 600,000 people live in an area of three square miles.  Most live on an income of less than a US$1 per day.  Crime and HIV/AIDs are common.  Many parents die of AIDS and leave their children to fend for themselves.  Mathare Community Outreach tries to care for as many of these orphans as possible, but their resources are limited.

Mathare facts
 70% of Nairobi's population of four million lives on 5% of the city's land area.

 Mathare Valley contains a population greater than the cities of Seattle, Denver, or Boston, yet the slum covers an area of only three square miles.  In comparison, Seattle covers 80 square miles, Boston 42 square miles, and Denver 150 square miles.

 It is estimated that one of every three adults in Mathare is HIV positive.

 The average life expectancy for a person who is HIV positive in Mathare is five years or less.

 Common health problems for children in Mathare include dysentery, malnutrition, malaria, typhoid, cholera, infections, tetanus, and polio.

 Juvenile heads of households are common.  This is a situation where a child or teen, some as young as 8 or 9 years old, is left to care for younger siblings, since both parents have died of AIDS.

 There are an estimated 70,000 children in the Mathare Valley, with only 3-4 schools to educate them.  Many children do not attend school.

 Without an education the children in the Mathare Valley often turn to a future of crime, prostitution, drug abuse and disease.

Religious and non-profit organizations are growing in the Mathare Valley.  For example, the Mission Of Hope International (MOHI), Christs Hope Kenya and Compassion International educate tens of thousands of children in schools, using tools that address issues such as HIV, health issues, and the need for employment.  Students' parents are educated regarding health issues and provided with opportunities for job training or microloans to facilitate job creation.

References

External links
OneLife Africa

Suburbs of Nairobi
Slums in Kenya